Eta Herculis (η Her, η Herculis) is a fourth-magnitude star in the constellation Hercules.

Properties 

Eta Herculis is a G-type star.  With a stellar classification G7.5IIIb, it is considerably larger than the Sun, having a mass that is 2.3 times solar and a radius 9.8 times.   Though it only shines with an apparent magnitude of 3.48, it is part of the "Keystone" asterism, visible overhead in the mid-summer night sky to northern observers, allowing it to be easily recognized.  Eta Herculis is 50 times more luminous than the Sun.  The Hipparcos satellite mission estimated its distance at roughly 34.4 parsecs from Earth, or 112 light years away.

If one follows the line connecting Eta Herculis with Zeta Herculis one comes across one of the earliest and most stunning globular clusters in the nighttime sky, M13, discovered in 1714 by Edmond Halley.

Eta Herculis is a double star once thought to be part of a binary star system.

References

External links 
Jim Kaler's Stars:Eta Herculis

Hercules (constellation)
Herculis, Eta
Double stars
Triple star systems
G-type giants
Herculis, 044
081833
150997
6220
BD-39 3029